The 2019 Mid-American Conference men's soccer season will be the 27th season of men's varsity soccer in the Mid-American Conference.

Akron enters the season as the conference tournament champions. West Virginia enters the season as the defending conference regular season champions.

Background

Previous season 

The 2018 season was the 26th season of men's varsity soccer in the Mid-American Conference. Akron won the 2018 MAC Men's Soccer Tournament against Western Michigan. With the MAC Tournament title, Akron earned an automatic bid into the 2018 NCAA Division I Men's Soccer Tournament. MAC regular season champions, West Virginia, earn an at-large bid into the NCAA Tournament. West Virginia and Akron were unseeded in the tournament meaning both programs began in the first round.

In the tournament, West Virginia advanced past LIU Brooklyn before losing in Georgetown in the second round. Akron reached the NCAA College Cup for the second consecutive season, and for the sixth time in program history. This came after defeating Rider, Syracuse, Wake Forest, three-time defending champions Stanford, and Michigan State. In the 2018 NCAA Division I Men's Soccer Championship Game, Akron lost to Maryland, 0–1 off of a penalty kick from Amar Sejdič.

Coaching changes 
Ahead of the 2019 season, SIUE head coach Mario Sanchez was hired by professional soccer club, Louisville City FC. Cale Wassermann was hired to replace Sanchez.

Teams

Preseason

Preseason poll 
The preseason poll was released on August 26, 2019.

Preseason national polls 
The preseason national polls were released in July and August 2019. United Soccer Coaches, Soccer America, and TopDrawer Soccer have a Top 25 poll, while College Soccer News has a Top 30 poll.

Regular season

Early season tournaments 

Early season tournaments will be announced in late Spring and Summer 2019.

Conference results

Standings

Postseason

MAC Tournament 

The 2019 MAC Tournament was held from November 12–17, 2019.

NCAA Tournament 

The NCAA Tournament will begin in November 2019 and conclude on December 17, 2019.

Rankings

National rankings

Regional rankings - USC North Region 

The United Soccer Coaches' North Region includes teams from the Mid-American Conference, the Big Ten Conference, and the Horizon League.

Awards and honors

Player of the week honors

Postseason honors

National awards

2020 MLS Draft

The 2020 MLS SuperDraft will be held in January 2020.

Homegrown players 

The Homegrown Player Rule is a Major League Soccer program that allows MLS teams to sign local players from their own development academies directly to MLS first team rosters. Before the creation of the rule in 2008, every player entering Major League Soccer had to be assigned through one of the existing MLS player allocation processes, such as the MLS SuperDraft.

To place a player on its homegrown player list, making him eligible to sign as a homegrown player, players must have resided in that club's home territory and participated in the club's youth development system for at least one year. Players can play college soccer and still be eligible to sign a homegrown contract.

References

External links 
 MAC Men's Soccer

 
2019 NCAA Division I men's soccer season